The Family Group, or The Family, is an outdoor stone sculpture by John Geise, installed on the south lawn, outside the Jordan Schnitzer Museum of Art, on the University of Oregon campus in Eugene, Oregon, in the United States. Dates from the work range from 1967 to 1973. It was presented to the university in 1974 by the William A. Haseltine family, in honor of administrator Karl Onthank. An inscription reads, ""

References

Further reading
 

Monuments and memorials in Eugene, Oregon
Outdoor sculptures in Eugene, Oregon
Stone sculptures in Oregon
University of Oregon campus
Stone statues